David Attoub (born 7 June 1981 in Valence, Drôme) is a French rugby union footballer of Tunisian origin, currently playing for Montpellier in the Top 14. He formerly played for Valence Sportif, Clermont Auvergne, Castres Olympique and Stade Français, and has also played for France. His position is prop.

Career
David Attoub played for Valence Sportif in Fédérale 1 from 2000 until 2003, when he signed for ASM Clermont Auvergne for the next season. He stayed there until 2005. Montferrand were finalists of the 2003-04 European Challenge Cup, but were defeated by Harlequins by one point, 27 to 26. He was included in France's squad for a test against the United States on 3 July 2004 but was not used from the bench.

He signed with Castres Olympique for the 2005-06 Top 14. He was included in France's squad for two mid year test matches in June 2006, and went on to make his international debut against Romania on 17 June. He joined the Stade Français in 2007.

In December 2009, Attoub was cited for contact with the eye/eye area of Ulster player Stephen Ferris in contravention of Law 10.4. He received a record 70-week ban. A contributing factor in the length of the ban was the fact that he had been found guilty of eye gouging earlier in his career.

David Attoub signed with Montpellier for the 2014–15 Top 14 season.

References

External links 
 David Attoub on ercrugby.com
 David Attoub on statistics.scrum.com

1981 births
Living people
Sportspeople from Valence, Drôme
French sportspeople of Tunisian descent
ASM Clermont Auvergne players
French rugby union players
France international rugby union players
Rugby union props